Ryan James Yates (born 21 November 1997) is an English professional footballer who plays as a midfielder for Premier League club Nottingham Forest.

Club career
Yates was named as part of the Nottingham Forest first-team squad at the start of the 2016–17 season, before heading north to National League side Barrow for an initial period of one-month on 26 August 2016. On 21 September Barrow opted to extend the loan deal, and again on 2 November until 9 January 2017. After this final extension to the deal, Barrow manager Paul Cox said of Yates: "He's a diamond in terms of wanting to learn, wanting to get better, wanting to get stronger. That's what makes Ryan so potent in this squad. He rubs off on other people with his hunger and desire."

Yates was recalled by Forest on 13 January, having made nineteen appearances and scoring twice in all competitions for Barrow.

On 31 January, shortly after his recall from Barrow, Yates was loaned out to League One's Shrewsbury Town for the remainder of the season. He made his professional league debut on 14 February as a 64th-minute substitute of a 2–1 loss to Peterborough United. On 27 February, whilst on loan with Shrewsbury Town, Yates extended his contract at Forest until 2019. Yates was shown the first red card of his professional career on 1 April for two sliding tackles in a game at Bristol Rovers, despite having been pushed to the floor by the opponent's players after the second challenge, in a decision described by his loan club as "harsh".

On 4 August 2017 Yates joined Notts County on loan for the 2017–18 season, joining fellow Forest midfielder Jorge Grant at the club. His debut for the club came on 8 August away at Scunthorpe United in the first round of the EFL Cup. Yates started the match and scored in the last minute of the second period of extra time to equalise the score to 3–3. Although Notts lost the subsequent penalty shootout, Yates received praise from his manager Kevin Nolan, who described the teenager as a "leader" with "bags and bags of potential".

On 11 January 2018, Yates signed a deal keeping him at Nottingham Forest until 2020, and was recalled from his loan at Notts County to join League One club Scunthorpe United for the remainder of the 2017–18 season. He scored on his Iron début against Peterborough United, in what the Scunthorpe Telegraph described as a "man of the match performance". Sky Sports awarded Yates the man of the match trophy for the 1–1 draw with Oxford United on 30 March.

On 5 July 2018, Yates signed a new three-year deal with Nottingham Forest, keeping him at the club until 2021. In December 2019 he extended his contract until 2023.

Yates received great credit for his performances during the 2021–22 season, with a particular increase in his goal output. He featured in the EFL Championship Team of the Season.

Career statistics

Honours
Nottingham Forest
EFL Championship play-offs: 2022
Individual
EFL Championship Team of the Season: 2021–22

References

External links

Profile at the Nottingham Forest F.C. website

1997 births
Living people
Footballers from Nottingham
English footballers
Association football midfielders
Nottingham Forest F.C. players
Barrow A.F.C. players
Shrewsbury Town F.C. players
Notts County F.C. players
Scunthorpe United F.C. players
English Football League players
Premier League players